Québec Cinéma presents an annual award for Best Director to recognize the best in the Cinema of Quebec.

Until 2016, it was known as the Jutra Award for Best Director in memory of influential Quebec film director Claude Jutra. Following the withdrawal of Jutra's name from the award, the 2016 award was presented under the name Québec Cinéma. The Prix Iris name was announced in October 2016.

1990s

2000s

2010s

2020s

See also
Canadian Screen Award for Best Director

References

Awards established in 1999
Awards for best director
Director
Quebec-related lists
1999 establishments in Canada